Juan Cruz "JC" Aragone (born June 28, 1995) is an American tennis player. He attended the University of Virginia and was a member of three NCAA Men's Tennis Championship winning teams. Aragone made his first ATP main-draw appearance at the 2017 US Open after coming through qualifying.

Early life and amateur career
Aragone is from Yorba Linda, California and took classes through the Parkview School, an independent study school based in Placentia, California. In January 2012, Aragone was hospitalized due to liver and kidney failure after developing an allergic reaction to an acne medication. That same year, he was diagnosed with type 1 diabetes. Despite these challenges, Aragone finished his junior career competing in two junior US Opens and ranked 14th in his graduating class. He committed to playing college tennis at the University of Virginia.

While at Virginia, Aragone helped the Cavaliers win three straight NCAA Men's Tennis Championships. He was named to the NCAA All-Tournament team twice, in both singles and doubles, and was a two-time ACC Tournament MVP. Aragone finished his college career with a 109–22 record.

Professional career
Aragone was awarded a wild card into the 2017 US Open qualifying tournament. He defeated Marco Cecchinato, Riccardo Bellotti, and Akira Santillan to secure a spot in the main draw of the 2017 US Open, where he lost to 28th seed Kevin Anderson.

Personal life
JC's parents are Paula and Facundo Aragone. He has one brother named Tommy. Aragone majored in government while at Virginia. He also interned at J.P. Morgan in New York City during the summer of 2016, balancing urban tennis practice with the demands of a Wall Street job. He received an offer to return to the company full-time, but opted instead to pursue his dream of a professional career in tennis.

ATP Challenger and ITF Futures/World Tennis Tour finals

Singles: 5 (3–2)

Doubles: 15 (6–9)

References

External links
 
 
 Virginia Cavaliers bio

1995 births
Living people
Virginia Cavaliers men's tennis players
American male tennis players
Tennis players from Buenos Aires
Argentine emigrants to the United States